Hirschberg is a town in the Saale-Orla-Kreis district, in Thuringia, Germany. It is situated on the river Saale, 20 km south of Schleiz, 12 km northwest of Hof (Bavaria), and 25 km southwest of Plauen (Saxony).

History

Demographics, politics and government
Hirschberg is located next to the motorway A 9 (Berlin – Munich). The city includes the subdivisions: Juchhöh, Göritz, Sparnberg, Ullersreuth and Venzka.

Annexation of Subdivisions 
The dates into the brackets are the first documentary citations.
 1. January 1974: Venzka (24. July 1348) with Juchhöh (1713-1715)
 8. March 1994: Göritz (20. February 1282), Sparnberg (1202) and Ullersreuth (1246)

Population 
Trend of population figures (reference is starting at 1994):

Culture

See also

References

Towns in Thuringia
Inner German border
Saale-Orla-Kreis
Principality of Reuss-Gera